The 1953 Lafayette Leopards baseball team represented Lafayette College in the 1953 NCAA baseball season. The Leopards played their home games at Fisher Field. The team was coached by Charlie Gelbert in his 8th year at Lafayette.

The Leopards won the District II Playoff to advanced to the College World Series, where they were defeated by the Texas Longhorns.

Roster

Schedule 

! style="" | Regular Season
|- valign="top" 

|- align="center" bgcolor="#ccffcc"
| 1 || April 2 || at  || Unknown • Washington, D.C. || 2–1 || 1–0
|- align="center" bgcolor="#ffcccc"
| 2 || April 3 || vs Fort Eustis || Unknown • Virginia Beach, Virginia || 9–10 || 1–1
|- align="center" bgcolor="#ffcccc"
| 3 || April 4 || vs  || Unknown • Virginia Beach, Virginia || 1–2 || 1–2
|- align="center" bgcolor="#fffdd0"
| 4 || April 7 || at  || Unknown • Philadelphia, Pennsylvania || 4–4 || 1–2–1
|- align="center" bgcolor="#ccffcc"
| 5 || April 11 ||  || Fisher Field • Easton, Pennsylvania || 3–2 || 2–2–1
|- align="center" bgcolor="#ccffcc"
| 6 || April 14 || at  || Unknown • Bethlehem, Pennsylvania || 6–3 || 3–2–1
|- align="center" bgcolor="#fffdd0"
| 7 || April 17 ||  || Fisher Field • Easton, Pennsylvania || 2–2 || 3–2–2
|- align="center" bgcolor="#ccffcc"
| 8 || April 22 || at  || Unknown • Allentown, Pennsylvania || 5–2 || 4–2–2
|- align="center" bgcolor="#ccffcc"
| 9 || April 25 ||  || Fisher Field • Easton, Pennsylvania || 8–3 || 5–2–2
|- align="center" bgcolor="#ccffcc"
| 10 || April 28 || at  || Unknown • Reading, Pennsylvania || 11–1 || 6–2–2
|- align="center" bgcolor="#ccffcc"
| 11 || April 30 || at  || Erny Field • Philadelphia, Pennsylvania || 11–7 || 7–2–2
|-

|- align="center" bgcolor="#ccffcc"
| 12 || May 6 || Muhlenberg || Fisher Field • Easton, Pennsylvania || 11–0 || 8–2–2
|- align="center" bgcolor="#ccffcc"
| 13 || May 8 ||  || Fisher Field • Easton, Pennsylvania || 8–0 || 9–2–2
|- align="center" bgcolor="#fffdd0"
| 14 || May 9 || at  || Taylor Stadium • Bethlehem, Pennsylvania || 3–3 || 9–2–3
|- align="center" bgcolor="#ccffcc"
| 15 || May 12 || at  || Unknown • Gettysburg, Pennsylvania || 14–3 || 10–2–3
|- align="center" bgcolor="#ccffcc"
| 16 || May 14 ||  || Fisher Field • Easton, Pennsylvania || 7–0 || 11–2–3
|- align="center" bgcolor="#ccffcc"
| 17 || May 16 || at  || Bainton Field • Piscataway, New Jersey || 4–0 || 12–2–3
|- align="center" bgcolor="#ccffcc"
| 18 || May 20 ||  || Fisher Field • Easton, Pennsylvania || 11–0 || 13–2–3
|- align="center" bgcolor="#ccffcc"
| 19 || May 22 ||  || Fisher Field • Easton, Pennsylvania || 13–3 || 14–2–3
|- align="center" bgcolor="#ffcccc"
| 20 || May 23 || Lehigh || Fisher Field • Easton, Pennsylvania || 1–2 || 14–3–3
|-

|-
|-
! style="" | Postseason
|- valign="top"

|- align="center" bgcolor="#ccffcc"
| 21 || June 3 ||  || Fisher Field • Easton, Pennsylvania || 6–1 || 15–3–3
|- align="center" bgcolor="#ccffcc"
| 22 || June 4 || Penn State || Fisher Field • Easton, Pennsylvania || 5–3 || 16–3–3
|-

|- align="center" bgcolor="#ccffcc"
| 23 || June 6 || Lehigh || Fisher Field • Easton, Pennsylvania || 8–3 || 17–3–3
|-

|- align="center" bgcolor="#ccffcc"
| 24 || June 11 || vs Colorado State || Omaha Municipal Stadium • Omaha, Nebraska || 6–2 || 18–3–3
|- align="center" bgcolor="#ffcccc"
| 25 || June 12 || vs Texas || Omaha Municipal Stadium • Omaha, Nebraska || 2–7 || 18–4–3
|- align="center" bgcolor="#ccffcc"
| 26 || June 13 || vs Stanford || Omaha Municipal Stadium • Omaha, Nebraska || 4–3 || 19–4–3
|- align="center" bgcolor="#ccffcc"
| 27 || June 14 || vs Boston College || Omaha Municipal Stadium • Omaha, Nebraska || 2–1 || 20–4–3
|- align="center" bgcolor="#ffcccc"
| 28 || June 15 || vs Texas || Omaha Municipal Stadium • Omaha, Nebraska || 3–4 || 20–5–3
|-

References 

Lafayette Leopards baseball seasons
Lafayette Leopards baseball
College World Series seasons
Lafayette Leopards